Alan Greenwood (born October 20, 1951) is an American rock musician who was a founding member and keyboardist of the rock band Foreigner from 1976 to 1980. He performed on the albums Foreigner (1977), Double Vision (1978) and Head Games (1979).

In 1981, Greenwood formed the band Spys with former Foreigner bass player Ed Gagliardi, John Blanco, John Digaudio and Billy Milne and recorded the albums Spys (1982) and Behind Enemy Lines (1983).

Greenwood played keyboards on one-time Rainbow (and future Yngwie Malmsteen's Rising Force) frontman Joe Lynn Turner's 1985 debut solo album, Rescue You.

Discography

Foreigner
1977: Foreigner (#4 US)
1978: Double Vision (#3 US, #32 UK)
1979: Head Games (#5 US)
1982: Records (#10 US, #58 UK)
1992: The Very Best ... and Beyond (#123 US, #19 UK)
1993: Classic Hits Live/Best Of Live
1994: JukeBox Heroes: The Best Of
1998: The Best of Ballads – I Want to Know What Love Is
1999: The Platinum Collection
2000: Hot Blooded And Other Hits
2000: Jukebox Heroes: The Foreigner Anthology
2002: Complete Greatest Hits (#80 US)
2002: The Definitive (#33 UK)
2004: Hot Blooded And Other Hits
2005: The Essentials 
2008: No End in Sight: The Very Best of Foreigner (#132 US)
2009: Can't Slow Down (#29 US)
2014: The Complete Atlantic Studio Albums 1977–1991

Ian Lloyd
1980: Third Wave Civilization

Spys
1982: Spys 
1983: Behind Enemy Lines
1996: Spys / Behind Enemy Lines

Joe Lynn Turner
1985: Rescue You (#146 US)
1998: Hurry Up and Wait
1999: Waiting For A Girl Like You (EP)
2016: Street of Dreams – Boston 1985

Jennifer Rush
1987: Heart Over Mind (#118 US, #48 UK)

Garbo Talks
1998: Garbo Talks

Equipment 
As per an interview conducted by Dominic Milano from Contemporary Keyboard (Keyboard since 1980), and appeared in the April 1979 issue, Greenwood states,

"When I first got into Foreigner I had a Hammond L-100 and an EML 101 synthesizer, and I think I had an Orchestron, but that's all been changed. Now I use a cutdown Hammond B-3, an ARP Omni, and a Wurlitzer electric piano. I still use the same EML 101, which I've had for about six years, and I just got an Oberheim OB-1, which is a really nice little programmable synthesizer."

References

Living people
1951 births
American rock keyboardists
Foreigner (band) members
20th-century American keyboardists